is a Japanese professional wrestler currently working as a freelancer and is best known for her tenure with the Japanese promotions DDT Pro-Wrestling and Tokyo Joshi Pro Wrestling.

Professional wrestling career

Independent circuit (2017–present)
At CyberFight Festival 2021, a multi-promotional event promoted by DDT, TJPW and Pro Wrestling Noah and Ganbare☆Pro-Wrestling on June 6, Kamifuku teamed up with Maki Itoh and Marika Kobashi, picking up a victory against Hikari Noa, Yuki Arai and Mizuki.

Tokyo Joshi Pro Wrestling (2017–present)
Kamifuku made her professional wrestling debut at TJPW Brand New Wrestling ~ The Beginning Of A New Era, an event promoted by Tokyo Joshi Pro Wrestling on August 26, 2017 where she teamed up with Yuna Manase in a losing effort against Mizuki and Nonoko. On November 7, 2020 at Wrestle Princess, Kamifuku won the vacant International Princess Championship by defeating Hikari Noa in the finals of an eight-woman single-elimination tournament. On January 4, 2021 at TJPW Tokyo Joshi Pro '21, she teamed up with Mahiro Kiryu to unsuccessfully challenge Bakuretsu Sisters (Nodoka Tenma and Yuki Aino) for the Princess Tag Team Championship.

DDT Pro-Wrestling (2017–present)
Kamifuku made her first appearance for DDT Pro-Wrestling at DDT Tokyo Game Show 2017 4Gamer on September 23, 2017 where she teamed up with Miyu Yamashita in a losing effort to Rika Tatsumi and Yuu.

She is known for working into various of the promotion's signature events. One of them is DDT Peter Pan, making her first appearance at Ryōgoku Peter Pan 2018 from October 21 where she teamed up with Mina Shirakawa and Miyu Yamashita in a losing effort against Yuka Sakazaki, Mizuki and Shoko Nakajima as a result of a six-woman tag team match. One year later at Wrestle Peter Pan 2019 on July 15, she participated in a Rumble rules match for the Ironman Heavymetalweight Championship won by Yukio Sakaguchi and also involving Hiroshi Yamato, Shiro Koshinaka, Joey Ryan, Gorgeous Matsuno and others.

Another branch of events in which she worked is the DDT Ultimate Party. At Ultimate Party 2019 on November 3, she competed in a Rumble rules match for the Ironman Heavymetalweight Championship won by Kazuki Hirata and also involving Toru Owashi, Harukaze, Sagat and others.

Personal life
Kamifuku lived in Ohio, United States as a teenager with her family while her father was working there.

Championships and accomplishments
DDT Pro-Wrestling
Ironman Heavymetalweight Championship (1 time)
Pro Wrestling Illustrated
 Ranked No. 120 of the top 150 female wrestlers in the PWI Women's 150 in 2022
Tokyo Joshi Pro Wrestling
International Princess Championship (1 time)
International Princess Title Tournament (2020)
Osaka Three Man Festival Tournament (2020) – with Mina Shirakawa and Yuna Manase

References 

1993 births
Living people
Japanese female professional wrestlers
People from Kanagawa Prefecture
People from Fujisawa, Kanagawa
Sportspeople from Kanagawa Prefecture
21st-century professional wrestlers
Ironman Heavymetalweight Champions